Görbe is a surname. Notable people with the surname include:

János Görbe (1912–1968), Hungarian actor
Nóra Görbe (born 1956), Hungarian singer and actress, daughter of János

Hungarian-language surnames